San Vittorino is a Baroque former Roman Catholic church in Cittaducale, province of Rieti, region of Lazio, Italy. Soon after completion in 1613, the church collapsed into a sinkhole, and the roofless ruins remain, with the facade sheltering a mineral-water pool that streams out the former portal. The combination of ruins and nature create an air of mystery; the church was used in some of the scenes of the movie Nostalghia.

References

Roman Catholic churches in Lazio
Churches in the province of Rieti
Baroque architecture in Lazio
Church ruins